Elections took place on November 8, 2022 to select the next Texas Comptroller of Public Accounts. Incumbent Republican Party Comptroller Glenn Hegar was elected to a third term over Democratic opponent Janet Dudding with 56.4% of the vote.

Republican primary

Candidates

Nominee
Glenn Hegar, incumbent Comptroller

Eliminated in primary
Mark V. Goloby, business owner

Polling

Primary results

Democratic primary

Candidates

Nominee
 Janet T. Dudding, public accountant

Eliminated in runoff
 Angel Luis Vega, strategist and author

Eliminated in primary
 Tim Mahoney, attorney and planner

Endorsements

Polling

Primary results

Runoff results

Libertarian primary

Nominee
Alonzo Echavarria-Garza, Hearne city manager

General election

Polling

Results

Notes

References

External links
Official campaign websites
Janet Dudding (D) for Comptroller
Glenn Hegar (R) for Comptroller

Comptroller of Public Accounts
Texas